USS Swasey may refer to the following ships of the United States Navy:

 , a Clemson-class destroyer commissioned in 1919; transferred to the Royal Navy as HMS Rockingham, 1940
 , an Edsall-class destroyer escort commissioned in 1943 and decommissioned in 1946

United States Navy ship names